Leon Bibb (born October 5, 1944 in Butler, Alabama) is an American news anchor and commentator for WKYC in Cleveland, Ohio, and was a member of the BGSU Board of Trustees. Leon Bibb was the first African American primetime news anchor in Ohio.

Life and career 

Raised in Cleveland's Glenville neighborhood, Bibb graduated from Glenville High School.

From 1995 to 2017 Bibb anchored various newscasts at WEWS (most recently weekdays at noon) as well as hosting a Sunday morning show named Kaleidoscope, which focuses on urban issues in Cleveland. In the early 2000s, Bibb did a series called Our Hometown in which he focused on historical sites in the Cleveland area. He is known to take a camera operator to talk about a story in his own perspective, and such stories are now featured on WEWS under the title of "My Ohio".

Bibb retired from the anchor desk on August 1, 2017, but still appeared on WEWS hosting Kaleidoscope, as well as serving as a commentator during major news stories. He returned to WKYC-TV on August 6, 2018 to be a commentator and special feature reporter.

He is also a member of the Alpha Phi Alpha and Sigma Pi Phi fraternities.

Awards and honors
Journalism:
 Cleveland Press Club Distinguished Journalist Award

Television
Lower Great Lakes Emmy Awards - Gold Circle Award (50 years in television)

Halls of Fame:
 Ohio Broadcasting Hall of Fame
 Glenville High School Hall of Fame
 Bowling Green State University School of Communications Hall of Fame
 Associated Press Ohio Broadcasters Hall of Fame
 Cleveland Association of Broadcasters Hall of Fame

State/Local:
Section of Parkway Avenue on Cleveland's east side (where Bibb had grown up) renamed "Leon Bibb Way"

References

External links
Leon Bibb WKYC
Leon Bibb biography, Broadcasters Hall of Fame.
Broadcasters Hall of Fame: List of Inductees. Accessed 2007-09-26.

1944 births
Bowling Green State University alumni
African-American television personalities
Television anchors from Cleveland
Living people
Glenville High School alumni
People from Butler, Alabama
People from Shaker Heights, Ohio
Journalists from Alabama
Journalists from Ohio
21st-century African-American people
20th-century African-American people